Entre(tanto) is Sam the Kid's debut album and was widely considered a breakthrough in Portuguese hip-hop culture. The single he released for this album is called "Lágrimas". The album was re-released in the special edition of Sobre(tudo) called Sobre(tudo) (Special Edition).

Track listing

References 

1999 debut albums
Sam the Kid albums